Bayartsogtyn Mönkhzayaa (born 10 October 1993) is a Mongolian long-distance runner. She competed in the marathon event at the 2015 World Championships in Athletics in Beijing, China. In 2019, she competed in the women's marathon at the 2019 World Athletics Championships held in Doha, Qatar. She finished in 34th place.

References

External links
 

1993 births
Living people
Mongolian female long-distance runners
Mongolian female marathon runners
World Athletics Championships athletes for Mongolia
Place of birth missing (living people)
Athletes (track and field) at the 2016 Summer Olympics
Athletes (track and field) at the 2020 Summer Olympics
Athletes (track and field) at the 2014 Asian Games
Athletes (track and field) at the 2018 Asian Games
Olympic athletes of Mongolia
Asian Games competitors for Mongolia
Mongolian female cross country runners
20th-century Mongolian women
21st-century Mongolian women